Robbie Beazley (born 18 March 1974) is an Australian former professional rugby league footballer.

Background
Beazley was born in Dubbo, New South Wales, Australia.

While attending Dubbo South High School, Beazley played for the Australian Schoolboys team in 1992.

Playing career
He played for the Penrith Panthers and Illawarra Steelers in Australia and London Broncos in the Super League.

References

External links
Rugby League Project stats
Challenge Cup teams and profiles

1974 births
Living people
Australian expatriate sportspeople in England
Australian rugby league players
London Broncos players
Rugby league hookers
Rugby league players from Dubbo